The Château de Lalinde is a château, developed from a 13th-century castle, in the commune of Lalinde in the Dordogne département of France. It is known locally as le château de la Bastide.

History
Built in the 13th century overlooking the Dordogne River, the castle was known as Castrum de la Lynde.

During the 18th century, its keep was used as a prison.

Rebuilt during the 19th century, it was transformed into a hotel-restaurant. It is now a private residence.

Architecture
Built on foundations bordered by the river, this modest château has preserved two medieval corner turrets, joining what remains of the old keep.

See also

 List of castles in France

References

Châteaux in Dordogne